Isabelle Haverlag (born 4 March 2001) is a Dutch tennis player.

Career
Haverlag has a career-high doubles ranking by the Women's Tennis Association (WTA) of No. 162, achieved on 30 January 2023.

To date, she has won eight doubles titles on the ITF Women's World Tennis Tour. She won her biggest ITF title at the 2022 Engie Open de Seine-et-Marne, in the doubles draw, partnering Justina Mikulskytė.

ITF finals

Doubles: 19 (8 titles, 11 runner–ups)

References

External links
 
 

2001 births
Living people
Dutch female tennis players
21st-century Dutch women